Haliburton or Halliburton may refer to:

Places
Haliburton County, Ontario, a county in Canada
Dysart et al, Ontario, a municipality including the town of Haliburton

Companies
Halliburton, an oilfield services company based in the US and in the United Arab Emirates
Haliburton Broadcasting Group, a Canadian chain of radio stations
Zero Halliburton, a briefcase brand

People
Lord Haliburton of Dirleton, an extinct Lordship of Parliament in the Peerage of Scotland
Arthur Haliburton, 1st Baron Haliburton (1832–1907), a British civil servant
Brenton Halliburton (1774–1860), second Chief Justice of the Supreme Court of Nova Scotia
Erle P. Halliburton (1892–1957), founder of the oil and luggage companies
George Haliburton (disambiguation), or George Halliburton, several people
James Burton (1761–1837), British property developer, formerly James Haliburton
James Burton (Egyptologist) (1788–1862), formerly James Haliburton, British Egyptologist
Jeff Halliburton (born 1949), American basketball player
Mariotta Haliburton, Lady Home, 16th-century Scottish noblewoman
Richard Halliburton (1900–1939), American writer and adventurer
Thomas Chandler Haliburton (1796–1865), a Canadian writer, lawyer, and businessman; MP in both Nova Scotia and England
Tyrese Haliburton (born 2000), American basketball player
Walter de Haliburton, 1st Lord Haliburton of Dirleton, 15th-century Lord High Treasurer of Scotland
William Dobinson Halliburton (1860–1931), British physiologist and founding biochemist
William Hersey Otis Haliburton (1767–1829), lawyer, judge, and political figure in Nova Scotia

See also
Halyburton (disambiguation), an alternate spelling

English-language surnames
Scottish surnames